Marian Joyce Prado Rivera (born 1997) is a Bolivian model and beauty pageant titleholder who won Miss Bolivia 2018. she represented Bolivia at the Miss Universe 2018 pageant. Prado was stripped of her Miss Santa Cruz and Miss Bolivia crowns for 'breach of contract', when she confirmed she was pregnant in April 2019.

Personal life
Prado-Rivera lives in Santa Cruz, Bolivia. She was previously awarding as Miss Tourism Bolivia in 2015. She is professional model and tourism ambassador under the Promociones Gloria, Miss Bolivia Organization. On June 24, 2018 she won Miss Bolivia 2018 and she represented her country at the Miss Universe 2018.

Achievements

Reina Hispanoamericana 2018 3rd Runner-up
Miss Universe 2018 Unplaced
Miss Bolivia 2018
Miss Santa Cruz 2018
Miss Tourism International 2016 Top 10
Miss Tourism Bolivia 2015
Miss Litoral 2015

References 

Living people
1997 births
Bolivian female models
Bolivian beauty pageant winners
Miss Universe 2018 contestants
People from Santa Cruz de la Sierra